Pinder may refer to:

 Pinder (surname), people with the surname Pinder
 Pinder, New Brunswick, Canada
 Pinder Gully, gulley in Signey Island
 the keeper of a pinfold, i.e. of an animal pound
 Pinder's Drugs, a defunct Western Canadian pharmaceutical chain